Katherine Richardson (or similar) may refer to:

 Cathy Richardson (born 1969), American singer-songwriter
 Katharine Richardson (1854–1927), British mountain climber
 Katherine Richardson (swimmer), Canadian swimmer
 Katherine Gilmore Richardson, member of the Philadelphia City Council. 
 Katherine Richardson Christensen (born 1954), American-Danish oceanographer
 Kathy Kreag Richardson (born 1956), American Republican politician
 Katie Richardson (born 1988), Australian beauty pageant winner

See also
Kate Richardson (disambiguation)
Kathleen Richardson (disambiguation)
Richardson (surname)